Merpati Nusantara Airlines Flight 106 crashed on 19 April 1997, taking the lives of 11 of the 48 passengers and four of the five crew. The plane crashed during landing after a failed go-around in bad weather. This was the first hull loss of a British Aerospace ATP.

Aircraft
The aircraft was a BAe ATP c/n / msn 2048, Which had its first flight in 1992. It had two Pratt & Whitney Canada PW126. There were five crew and 48 passengers. 11 passengers and four crew died in the accident. 53 passengers and crew were on board.

Accident
Merpati flight 106 departed Jakarta (CGK) on a domestic flight to H.A.S. Hanandjoeddin International Airport (TJQ) at Tanjung Pandan where the airplane, named "Sangeang", had been cleared for a runway 36 approach. It reportedly entered a steep left bank while descending through 2,000 feet. Control was lost and the plane crashed in a coconut grove and broke in three. One of the propellers was found to be feathered.

References 

Aviation accidents and incidents in 1997
Accidents and incidents involving the British Aerospace ATP
Aviation accidents and incidents in Indonesia
1997 in Indonesia
April 1997 events in Asia